One Man Show may refer to:

 One Man Show (album), by Lindsey Buckingham
 One Man Show (film), 2001 Malayalam comedy-drama
 One Man Show (Lord Kossity), 1996 EP

See also
A One Man Show, Grace Jones music video collection
Solo performance, sometimes called a "one man show" or a "one person show".
Solo show (disambiguation)